Jorge Zermeño Infante (born 23 January 1949) is a Mexican lawyer and politician affiliated with the National Action Party. He is Mayor of Torreón (2018–2021), having previously served in this position from 1997 to 1999. From 2014 to 2017 he served as Senator of the LVIII and LIX Legislatures of the Mexican Congress representing Coahuila and as Deputy of the LX Legislature. He was the President of the Chamber of Deputies in 2006–2007.

He was also Ambassador of Mexico to Spain between 2007 and 2011.

References

1949 births
Living people
Members of the Senate of the Republic (Mexico)
Members of the Chamber of Deputies (Mexico)
Presidents of the Chamber of Deputies (Mexico)
National Action Party (Mexico) politicians
Ambassadors of Mexico to Spain
People from Mexico City
20th-century Mexican lawyers
21st-century Mexican politicians
Municipal presidents of Torreón